Igor Sergeyevich Shestakov (born 31 December 1984) is a Russian professional footballer. He plays for FC Peresvet Podolsk.

Club career
He played 6 seasons in the Russian Football National League for 4 different teams.

External links
 
 

1984 births
Footballers from Moscow
Living people
Russian footballers
Association football defenders
FC Saturn Ramenskoye players
FC Sibir Novosibirsk players
FC Chernomorets Novorossiysk players
FC Rotor Volgograd players
FC Khimki players
FC Orenburg players